Roberto Vilar (born 10 November 1976) is a retired Portuguese football midfielder.

References

1976 births
Living people
Portuguese footballers
C.F. União de Lamas players
SC São João de Ver players
Association football midfielders
Liga Portugal 2 players
Sportspeople from Santa Maria da Feira